Sidi Makhlouf is a district in Laghouat Province, Algeria. It was named after its capital, Sidi Makhlouf.

Municipalities
The district is further divided into 2 municipalities:
Sidi Makhlouf
El Assafia

References

Districts of Laghouat Province